Rutherfurd may refer to:

People 
 Andrew Rutherfurd, Lord Rutherfurd (1791–1854), Scottish judge
 Andrew Rutherfurd-Clark, Lord Rutherfurd-Clark (1828–1899), Scottish judge
 Edward Rutherfurd (born 1948), author of historical fiction (pen name)
 Emily Rutherfurd (born 1974), American actress
 Helena Rutherfurd Ely (1858-1920),  American author, amateur gardener and founding member of the Garden Club of America
 Janet Auchincloss Rutherfurd (1945–1985), American socialite and half-sister to Jacqueline Kennedy Onassis
 John Rutherfurd (1760–1840), American politician and land surveyor
 John Rutherfurd (soldier) (1712–1758), Scottish soldier and politician.
 Lewis Morris Rutherfurd (1816–1892), American lawyer, astronomer, astrophotographer
 Lucy Page Mercer Rutherfurd (1891–1948), mistress and long-time friend of United States President Franklin Delano Roosevelt
 Mary Rutherfurd Jay (1872–1953), great, great granddaughter of Founding Father John Jay, one of America's earliest landscape architects
 Walter Rutherfurd (1723–1804), Scottish-American soldier and merchant 
 William Gordon Rutherfurd (1765–1818), Royal Navy officer

Other
 Rutherfurd Hall a cultural center and museum located in Allamuchy, NJ
 Rutherfurd (crater), lunar impact crater 
 Rutherfurd Observatory, astronomical facility maintained by Columbia University
 Rutherford (disambiguation)